The 1998 World Weightlifting Championships were held in Lahti, Finland from November 7 to November 15. The women's competition in the super-heavyweight (+75 kg) division was staged on 14 November 1998.

Medalists

Records

Results

References
Results
Weightlifting World Championships Seniors Statistics, Page 14 

1998 World Weightlifting Championships
World